Coleophora follicularis is a moth of the family Coleophoridae. The species was first described in 1802 by Jean Nicolas Vallot, a French entomologist. It is found in all of Europe.

Adults are on wing from June to August.

The larvae feed on Asteraceae species, including Achillea clavenae, Achillea millefolium, Achillea moschata, Anthemis, Carduus, Chrysanthemum leucanthemum, Cirsium arvense, Eupatorium cannabinum, Inula britannica, Inula conyza, Inula helenium, Pulicaria dysenterica and Tanacetum species. They create a slender tubular silken case of about 10 mm long. It is straw coloured and three valved. The mouth angle is about 30°.

References

External links
 
 Coleophora follicularis at UKmoths

follicularis
Moths described in 1802
Moths of Europe
Taxa named by Jean Nicolas Vallot